Donald Trump signed a total of 570 proclamations from January 2017 to January 2021.

Cumulative number of proclamations signed by Donald Trump

Presidential proclamations
 List of proclamations by Donald Trump (2017)
 List of proclamations by Donald Trump (2018)
 List of proclamations by Donald Trump (2019)
 List of proclamations by Donald Trump (2020–21)

References

Notes

  National security directives are generally highly classified and are not executive orders. However, in an unprecedented move, the Trump administration ordered their national security directives to be published in the Federal Register.
  National Security and Homeland Security Presidential Directives address continuity of government in the event of a "catastrophic emergency" disrupting the U.S. population, economy, environment, infrastructure and government policy.
  United States Statutes at Large:  of August 10, 1990.
  Proclamation 9645 of September 24, 2017, supplements EO 13780 of March 6, 2017.
  On October 17, 2017, Judge Derrick Watson, of the United States District Court for the District of Hawaii issued another temporary restraining order that was asked by the state of Hawaii. Watson's decision noted that the latest ban "suffers from precisely the same maladies as its predecessor" as it "plainly discriminates based on nationality" and as such violates federal law and "the founding principles of this Nation."
  Made into effect by:  of October 6, 1964.
  Trump chose to observe the entire month of November to United States Veterans & their families and the traditional Veterans Day.
  
  Native Americans of the group United American Indians of New England in Plymouth, Massachusetts had their 48th annual solemn National Day of Mourning observance.
  On December 6, 2017, American clothing company Patagonia, Inc. sued the United States Government and President Donald Trump for his proclamations of reducing the Bears Ears National Monument by 85% and almost 50% of Grand Staircase–Escalante National Monument. The company believes that a million acres of land is at risk for permanent destruction. Patagonia is suing over the Property Clause of the U.S. Constitution in where it vests Congress with the power to manage federal lands. The company's CEO Rose Marcario contends that when Congress passed the Antiquities Act of 1906, "Congress delegated a limited amount of power to the President — specifically, the authority to create national monuments protecting certain federal land. But it did not give the President the power to undo a prior president's monument designations. It kept that power for itself."

Citations

Sources

External links

 Executive orders, presidential memoranda, and presidential proclamations on the White House's official website
 GPO's Federal Digital System (FDsys) - Bulk Data, Download multiple issues of the Federal Register or latest Code of Federal Regulations in XML.
 Executive Office of the President

2010s politics-related lists
2017-related lists
2017 beginnings
Proclamations
United States federal policy
Proclamations